The 2015 Men's EuroHockey Championship IV was the sixth edition of the EuroHockey Championship IV, the fourth tier of the European field hockey championships. It was held from 19 to 25 July 2015 in Vilnius, Lithuania.

The tournament also served as a qualifier for the 2017 EuroHockey Championship III with the winner, Slovakia and the runner-up, Denmark qualifying.

Teams
The following eight teams competed in the tournament:

Results

Preliminary round

Pool A

Pool B

Fifth tot eighth place classification

Pool C
The points obtained in the preliminary round against the other team are taken over.

First to fourth place classification

Semi-finals

Third and fourth place

Final

Final standings

 Promoted to the EuroHockey Championship III

References

External links
FIH page

EuroHockey Championship IV
Men 4
EuroHockey Championship IV Men
International field hockey competitions hosted by Lithuania
EuroHockey Championship IV Men
Sports competitions in Vilnius
21st century in Vilnius